is a public park in Shinagawa Ward and Ōta Ward, Tokyo, Japan. About 69% of the park is in Shinagawa, with the remaining 31% in Ōta.

Facilities
The park has an athletics stadium, baseball grounds, tennis courts and a gateball area.

See also
 Parks and gardens in Tokyo
 National Parks of Japan

References

 seaside-park.jp

External links
 sasp.mapion.co.jp

Parks and gardens in Tokyo
Shinagawa